Belgium was represented by Nicole and Hugo, with the song "Baby, Baby", at the 1973 Eurovision Song Contest, which took place in Luxembourg City on 7 April. "Baby, Baby" was the winner of the Belgian national final for the contest, held at the Amerikaans Theater in Brussels on 25 February. Nicole and Hugo had won the 1971 Belgian preselection with the song "Goeiemorgen, morgen", but days before the contest Nicole had fallen ill and was unable to travel to host city Dublin, so Jacques Raymond and Lily Castel had been drafted in as last-minute replacements.

Before Eurovision

Eurosong 
The final took place on 25 February 1973, with five acts performing two songs apiece. The winner was chosen by seven expert jurors who each named their favourite song, and "Baby, Baby" was the choice of four of them.

At Eurovision
On the night of the final Nicole and Hugo performed second in the running order, following Finland and preceding Portugal. Among the backing singers was Claude Lombard, Belgium's 1968 Eurovision entrant. At the close of the voting "Baby, Baby" had received 58 points, placing Belgium last of the 17 entries, the fourth time the country had finished at the foot of the Eurovision scoreboard. Notwithstanding the bad result however, the couple's outrageously camp styling and performance have ensured that "Baby, Baby" has over the years gained cult status amongst Eurovision fans. Several clips from the performance were shown during Eurovision's 50th anniversary TV gala Congratulations in 2005, culminating in a live appearance by the pair, wearing their infamous purple 1973 outfits and performing an abridged version of the song. "Baby, Baby" remains an iconic Eurovision performance, far better remembered than hundreds of songs which finished much higher up the scoreboard.

Voting

References

External links
 Belgian 1973 ESC preselection (audio only)

1973
Countries in the Eurovision Song Contest 1973
Eurovision